The discography of British indie rock band The Go! Team consists of six studio albums, five extended plays, thirteen singles and twenty music videos.

Studio albums

Extended plays

Singles

Other appearances

Music videos

References

External links
 Official website
 The Go! Team at AllMusic
 
 

Discographies of British artists
Rock music group discographies